Roger Aandalen (born 8 June 1965) is a Norwegian boccia player.

He won a silver medal at the 2004 Summer Paralympics, as well as a bronze medal at the 2012 Summer Paralympics He has competed at the Paralympic Games in Atlanta 1996, Sydney 2000, Athens 2004, Beijing 2008, and London 2012.

He has cerebral palsy.

References

1965 births
Living people
Paralympic boccia players of Norway
Paralympic silver medalists for Norway
Paralympic bronze medalists for Norway
Paralympic medalists in boccia
Boccia players at the 1996 Summer Paralympics
Boccia players at the 2000 Summer Paralympics
Boccia players at the 2004 Summer Paralympics
Boccia players at the 2008 Summer Paralympics
Boccia players at the 2012 Summer Paralympics
Medalists at the 2004 Summer Paralympics
Medalists at the 2012 Summer Paralympics
Sportspeople from Gjøvik